Saint Nicholas Orthodox Church is a church in Springdale, Arkansas. Jonathan Boelkins was the project manager. It was converted from a metal shop garage. Marlon Blackwell was the church's architect. The church is located at 3171 South 48th Street across I-540 from Arvest Ballpark.

It includes a skylit tower and an addition on the western side. It is modern and sparse in decoration. It received the 2013 American Institute of Architects Honor Awards for Architecture, the 2012 AIA Small Project Award, the 2011 World Architecture Festival – Best Civic and Community Building award, the 2011 Chicago Athenaeum American Architecture Award, the 2011 Gulf States Regional AIA Merit Award, was the 2011 Architectural Record Magazine Online – November Feature, received the 2010 Architect Magazine Design Review Honor Award and won a 2010 Arkansas AIA Honor Award.

References

External links
 
 Marlon Blackwell Architects

Antiochian Orthodox Church in the United States
Buildings and structures in Springdale, Arkansas
Churches in Washington County, Arkansas
Eastern Orthodoxy in Arkansas